Chaek is a village in Naryn Region of Kyrgyzstan on the A361 highway which crosses the north of the region. Its population was 3,762 in 2021. It is the center of the Jumgal District. It is about 100km west of Kochkor and 45km west of Lake Song-Köl. It is the largest of several villages in an agricultural valley. Further west the scenery becomes more dramatic.

Population

References

Populated places in Naryn Region